Local H's Awesome Mix Tape #2 is an extended play by American alternative rock duo Local H, which was released in December 2014 through their merchandiser, G&P Records. Their version of "Team" was previously released as The Team EP, which was sold exclusively through live shows and from the official G&P Records website.

Track listing

Personnel
Scott Lucas - Vocals, guitar
Ryan Harding - Drums
Anthony Herrara - Artwork, design
Andy Gerber - Recording
Greg Norman - Recording

References

2014 EPs
Covers EPs
Local H EPs
Self-released EPs